Wei Shaoxuan is a Chinese archer. He competed in archery at the 2020 Summer Olympics.

References

Living people
2000 births
Chinese male archers
Archers at the 2020 Summer Olympics
Olympic archers of China
Archers at the 2018 Asian Games
21st-century Chinese people